Kirk Bryde (born 7 September 1949) is a Canadian athlete. He competed in the men's pole vault at the 1972 Summer Olympics.

References

1949 births
Living people
Athletes (track and field) at the 1972 Summer Olympics
Canadian male pole vaulters
Olympic track and field athletes of Canada
Athletes from Vancouver
Washington Huskies men's track and field athletes